This is a list of all tornadoes that were confirmed by local offices of the National Weather Service in the United States from July to August 2009.

July

July 1 event

July 3 event

July 4 event

July 5 event

July 7 event

July 8 event

July 11 event

July 12 event

July 13 event

July 14 event

July 15 event

July 16 event

July 17 event (Southeast)

July 17 event (Colorado)

July 18 event (Maine)

July 18 event (New Mexico)

July 20 event

July 21 event

July 23 event

July 24 event

July 25 event

July 26 event

July 27 event

July 28 event

July 29 event (Northeast)

July 29 event (Colorado)

July 30 event

July 31 event

August

Note: 1 tornado was confirmed in the final totals, but does not have a listed rating.

August 2 event

August 4 event

August 6 event

August 8 event

August 9 event

August 12 event

August 14 event

August 15 event

August 16 event

August 17 event

August 18 event

August 19 event

August 20 event

August 21 event

August 26 event

August 29 event

August 30 event

See also

Tornadoes of 2009

References

Tornadoes of 2009
2009, 07
July 2009 events in the United States
August 2009 events in the United States